Ira Silverberg is an American editor and consultant to writers, artists, publishers, funders, and non-profit arts organizations. He is a member of the adjunct faculty of the Columbia University School of the Arts, MFA Writing Program.

Education 
Silverberg graduated from the Bronx High School of Science in 1980 and went to what was then known as the CUNY Urban Legal Studies Center, a six-year BA/JD Program run by W. Haywood Burns, designed to teach lawyers to serve underserved urban communities, in collaboration with New York Law School. It became the model for the CUNY Law School  and CCNY developed the undergraduate Honors Program in Legal Studies at The Colin Powell School. He left New York City for Lawrence, Kansas where he attended the University of Kansas from 1982-1984. In 1985, he returned to New York and attended Hunter College. He dropped out of college at 22 years old, 18 credits shy of a degree, when he became the Publicity Director of Grove Press, hired by Barney Rosset.

Career 
Ira Silverberg is a consultant in publishing and the literary arts. He was an agent and editor in New York literary publishing until 2011 when was appointed as the Literature Director of the National Endowment for the Arts in Washington, DC. Prior to joining the NEA, Silverberg worked as a literary agent and foreign rights director at Sterling Lord Literistic, as Editor-in-Chief at Grove Press, and as editorial and publishing director at Serpent's Tail's U.S. projects including the legendary High Risk Books co-edited with Amy Scholder. He also founded the marketing and public relations firm, Ira Silverberg Communications. This firm has attracted clients like The Academy of American Poets, William S. Burroughs, the estate of David Wojnarowicz, Dennis Cooper, City Lights Publications, and Re/Search Publications.

Silverberg began his career as a part-time editorial and publicity assistant at The Overlook Press in 1984. He was a part-time student at Hunter College. He had met Overlook's owner Peter Mayer  in 1982 in Boulder, Colorado at the twenty-fifth anniversary celebration of Jack Kerouac's On the Road. He was there as the guest of William S. Burroughs,  and James Grauerholz, with whom he lived. Burroughs was on faculty at the Jack Kerouac School of Disembodied Poetics, a program of Naropa University, founded by Allen Ginsberg and Anne Waldman. He credits Grauerholz and Burroughs as providing the inspiration to pursue a career in the arts. He worked with Burroughs in various capacities until his death in 1997. He continues a business and personal relationship with Grauerholz.

When offered the opportunity to work full-time at $10,000 per year, he accepted. To supplement his publishing salary, he returned to the Limelight nightclub, where he had promoted events, including Burroughs' 70th Birthday party, to work weekends as the VIP Doorman. Silverberg promoted events at Limelight and Danceteria beginning in 1984. Among them were book launches for Burroughs, artist David Hockney, and writers Brad Gooch and Dennis Cooper, who became his client and with whom he has had a life-long affiliation.   

Silverberg began going to "downtown" New York nightclubs as a high school student. He first went to Hurrah in 1979 to hear the popular post-punk band The Speedies.  Two of the members Oliver (Dembling) North, who later joined The Comateens, and Eric Hoffert, were also students of the Bronx High School of Science with Silverberg. He arrived at Hurrah, for the Speedies show, carrying a Charivari shopping bag, and was asked by legendary doormen Haoui Montaug and Aleph Ashline, what was in the bag. He worked part-time at Charivari Sport, one of the legendary upper west side clothing stores founded by the Weiser family. It was a pair of pleated oxblood pants finished in a coating of what looked like plastic or urethane, prompting a long conversation with Montaug with whom Silverberg went home with that night. They had a brief relationship and a long friendship which allowed Silverberg entry, at a young age, to the downtown scene.  By the time he landed in Burroughs' "Bunker" in June 1981, when he met Grauerholz at The Bar, an East Village Gay Bar, he had established an affinity for the alternative scene.

Montaug was one of many friends and lovers Silverberg lost to AIDS. The loss of two mentors, artist Carl Apfelschnitt and translator and New York State Council On The Arts Literature Director Gregory Kolovakos was an important departure point for his life as an editor.  He saw their passing in the context of that of an entire generation of Gay men and intravenous drug users whose voices wouldn't be heard.  Silverberg stopped using heroin in 1989 and felt keenly that the voices of those in pain, those in the margins, spoke more to societal conditions than those of the dominant culture..  

A conversation with Amy Scholder led to them partnering on preparing an anthology which attempted to keep the voices of their friends alive, keep trangeressive work vital, and respond to increasing attacks on artists by the far right. High Risk: An anthology of Forbidden Writings was published by Dutton and Plume at the height of the Culture Wars of that time. Another volume followed, High Risk: Writing on Sex, Death and Subversion, in 1994. Among the writers included in both volumes were Karen Finley, Essex Hemphill, Kathy Acker, David Wojnarowicz, Mary Gaitskill, William S. Burroughs, Dorothy Allison, Dennis Cooper, Ana Maria Simo, Darryl Pinckney, Akilah Nayo Oliver, Darius James, Lynne Tillman, Craig G. Harris, Rikki Ducornet, John Giorno, Cookie Mueller, John Preston, Diamanda Galas, Gil Cuadros, Kate Bornstein, and Manuel Ramos Otero. The anthologies are considered influential in defining the Downtown aesthetic. They were also decidedly inclusive at a time when that idea was just emerging in the arts.  

High Risk Books was born of the success of those anthologies. They were both published in the UK by the independent house Serpent's Tail, a public relations client of Silverberg's in the US.  Silverberg simultaneously ran Ira Silverberg Communications, a public relations firm and literary agency he started when he left Grove Press in 1990. 

Silverberg worked to establish Serpent's Tail in the US by publishing locally originated books, the first of which was the fiction collection, Disorderly Conduct: The VLS Fiction Reader, edited by the Village Voice Literary Supplement (VLS) editor M. Mark. Extending that to a US imprint was the next step. Scholder and Silverberg co-edited the High Risk series beginning in 1994. The press published Sapphire, Gary Indiana, June Jordan, Herve Guibert, Jayne Cortez, Renaud Camus, Pagan Kennedy, John Giorno, Diamanda Galas, Cookie Mueller, and Lynne Tillman. Many of their writers were in the High Risk and VLS anthologies and considered in the vanguard of "transgressive" literature. 

High Risk Books were paperback originals, with the exception of titles by Diamanda Galas and William Burroughs, and priced affordably. They were designed by artist and graphic designer Rex Ray and were, for their first few seasons, printed on luxury paper and with French flaps. High Risk Books was shut down by Serpent's Tail's owner Pete Aytron in 1997. Silverberg returned to Grove Press as Editor in Chief in 1997. He contributed the Serpent's Tail/High Risk Archives, as well as his own to the Fales Library of NYU.

In his time at Grove, Silverberg famously reissued the out of print work of Jacqueline Susann. In 1997, Grove reissued Susann's best-selling Vallley of the Dolls along with Once is Not Enough and The Love Machine. Valley of the Dolls continues to be one of Grove's best-selling titles.  Silverberg also reissued other overlooked pop classics including Iceberg Slim's Doom Fox and Andy Warhol's novel A. He published Fernando Pessoa & Co.,Selected Poems by Fernando Pessoa Edited and translated by Richard Zenith; Whiting Award winner Samantha Gillison's debut novel An Undiscovered  Country; and brought William S. Burroughs back to Grove before his death in 1997 publishing Word Virus: The William S Burroughs Reader which he coedited with James Grauerholz; and Burroughs; Last Words. Silverberg attempted to bring Allen Ginsberg back to Grove as well but caught between an agent and his publisher, he felt trapped and left to become a literary agent full time.

Silverberg joined Donadio & Olson in 1997, where he eventually became a partner. He left to join Sterling Lord Literistic in 2007 before leaving in 2011. He was also the Foreign Rights Director at both agencies. He represented, amongst others, National Book Award and Pulitzer Prize finalist Adam Haslett as well as National Book Award finalists Rene Steinke and Christopher Sorrentino; New York Times Best-sellers Ishmael Beah, Neil Strauss, Erica Kennedy and Kate Spade; Sam Lipsyte, Binnie Kirshenbaum, Han Ong, Wayne Koestenbaum, Whiting Award winner Lysley Tenorio, and the estates of Derek Jarman, David Wojnarowicz, Kathy Acker, and Tim Dlugos.

Since returning to New York in 2013, he worked as a Strategic Advisor at Open Road Media and as a Senior Editor at Simon and Schuster where he published, among other books, notable debuts such as Lisa Halliday's Asymmetry, Tope Folarin's A Particular Kind of Black Man, Ryan Chapman's Riots I Have Known, and Rodrigo Hasbun's Affections. He is an advisor in the Bloomberg Philanthropies AIM Program administered by the DeVos Institute of Arts Management where he has worked with many arts organizations.

Silverberg has become affiliated with many cultural institutions in New York City, including BOMB magazine and the Member's Council of PEN American Center. He has also acted as judge for the Gregory Kolovakos Award for AIDS writing and been a panelist for the National Endowment for the Arts Literature Program and the Lila Wallace-Reader's Digest Fund. He has acted as editorial advisor to the Portable Lower East Side, has been a visiting faculty member at The New School for Social Research, and currently teaches at Columbia University.

Notes

Literary agents
Living people
American editors
American LGBT people
Year of birth missing (living people)